Hanken is a surname. Notable people:
 Albert Hanken (1926–2016), Dutch mathematician
 James Hanken, American biologist and Professor of Zoology at Harvard University
 Ray Hanken (1911–1980), American football player
 Tamme Hanken (1960–2016)
 Jerome J. Hanken (1934-2009), American Chess player
Hanken School of Economics is a business school in Finland